Passy Cemetery is a small cemetery in Passy, in the 16th arrondissement of Paris, France.

History
The current cemetery replaced the old cemetery (l'ancien cimetière communal de Passy, located on Rue Lekain), which was closed in 1802.

In the early 19th century, on the orders of Napoleon I, Emperor of the French, all the cemeteries in Paris were replaced by several large new ones outside the precincts of the capital. Montmartre Cemetery was built in the north, Père Lachaise Cemetery in the east, and Montparnasse Cemetery in the south. Passy Cemetery was a later addition, but has its origins in the same edict.

The current entrance was built in 1934 (designed by René Berger). The retaining wall of the cemetery is adorned with a bas relief (by Louis Janthial) commemorating the soldiers who fell in World War I.

Notes
Opened in 1820 in the expensive residential and commercial districts of the Right Bank near the Champs-Élysées, by 1874 the small Passy Cemetery had become the aristocratic necropolis of Paris. It is the only cemetery in Paris to have a heated waiting-room.

Sheltered by a bower of chestnut trees, the cemetery is in the shadow of the Eiffel Tower.

The cemetery was once the home of a statue by Dunikowski titled The Soul Escaping the Body. It was on top of the ceremonial grave of Antoni Cierplikowski. The statue was known by many but was removed when the grave was cleared in 2004.

It is known as a small but well visited cemetery (Petit mais bien fréquenté).

Notable interments
Among its more famous residents are:

 Bảo Đại (1913–1997), the last Emperor of Vietnam
 Natalie Clifford Barney (1876–1972), Notable author, salonist and lesbian socialite of the Belle Époque
 Jean-Louis Barrault (1910–1994), actor and director; buried with his wife, the actress Madeleine Renaud
 Louis-Ernest Barrias (1841–1905), sculptor
 Jeanne Julia Bartet (1854–1941), actress
 Marie Bashkirtseff (1858–1884), Ukrainian artist famous for her published journal; her tomb is a recreation of her studio and has been declared a historical monument by the government of France
 Maurice Bellonte (1896–1983), pioneering aviator, as is his flight companion Dieudonné Costes
 James Gordon Bennett Jr. (1848–1918), American newspaper publisher, sportsman
 Tristan Bernard (1866–1947), playwright and novelist
 Henri Bernstein (1876–1953), actor
 Princess Brasova (Natalia Sheremetyev-Romanov) (1880–1952), wife of Grand Duke Mikhail Romanov
 George, Count Brasov (1910–1931), son of Grand Duke Mikhail Romanov and Princess Brasova (Natalia Sheremetyev-Romanov)
 Emmanuel de Las Cases (1766–1842), historian
 Dieudonné Costes (1896–1973), pioneering aviator, as is his flight companion Maurice Bellonte
 Emmanuelle de Dampierre (1913–2012), first wife of Infante Jaime, Duke of Segovia
 Marcel Dassault (1892–1986), engineer, founder of Dassault Aviation
 Claude Debussy (1862–1918), composer
 Maxime Dethomas (1867–1929), artist
 Ghislaine Dommanget (1900–1991), Princess of Monaco
 Michel Droit (1923–2000), novelist, member of the Académie française
 Henry Farman (1874–1958), champion cyclist and aviator
 Edgar Faure (1908–1988), statesman and World War II resistance fighter
 Gabriel Fauré (1845–1924), composer
 Fernandel (Fernand Joseph Désiré Contandin) (1903–1971), comedy actor
 Maurice Gamelin (1872–1958), supreme commander of French armed forces 1939–1940
 Maurice Genevoix (1890–1980), novelist; his remains were transferred to the Panthéon in 2020
 Rosemonde Gérard (1871–1953), poet and playwright
 Virgil Gheorghiu, (1916–1992), novelist
 Farideh Ghotbi (also known as Farideh Diba) (1921–2000), the mother of the former Shahbanu of Iran, Farah Diba
 Jean Giraudoux (1882–1944), playwright, soldier, and statesman
 Hubert de Givenchy (1927–2018), fashion designer
 Anna Gould (1878–1961), socialite, daughter of financier Jay Gould
 Arlette Gueudet (1919–2012), widow of industrialist Robert Gueudet
 Jacques Guerlain (1874–1963), perfume creator from the House "Guerlain" in Paris
 Antonio Guzmán Blanco (1829–1899), Venezuelan politician and president
 Gabriel Hanotaux (1853–1944), statesman and historian
 Henriette Henriot (1857–1944), actress and artist's model
 Paul Hervieu (1857–1915), dramatist and novelist
 Gholam Hossein Jahanshahi (1920–2005), economist, Iranian statesman
 Jeanne Hugo (1869–1941), socialite and granddaughter of Victor Hugo
 Jacques Ibert (1890–1962), composer
 Paul Landowski (1875–1961), architect and sculptor
 Hector Lefuel (1810–1880), architect of the "Nouveau Louvre" expansion of the Louvre Palace
 Joseph Florimond Loubat (1831–1927), bibliophile, antiquarian, sportsman, and philanthropist
 Albéric Magnard (1865–1914), composer
 Georges Mandel (1885–1944), statesman, French Resistance during World War II
 Édouard Manet (1832–1883), realist and impressionist painter
 André Messager (1853–1929), composer and conductor
 Alexandre Millerand (1859–1943), President of France
 Octave Mirbeau (1848–1917), anarchist, art critic, and novelist
 Berthe Morisot (1841–1895), impressionist painter
 Togrul Narimanbekov (1930–2013), Azerbaijani painter
 Joseph O'Kelly (1828–1885), Henri O'Kelly sr. (1859–1938), and Henri O'Kelly jr. (1881–1922), Franco-Irish composers and musicians
 Leila Pahlavi (1970–2001), Princess Leila of Iran, daughter of the last Shah of Iran and Farah Diba
 Gabrielle Réjane (1856–1920), actress
 Madeleine Renaud (1900–1994), actress; buried with her husband, the actor and director Jean-Louis Barrault
 Marcel Renault (1872–1903), industrialist, racing driver, co-founder of Renault motor company
 Maurice Rostand (1891–1968), playwright
 Constantin Rozanoff (1905–1954), colonel, test pilot
 Haroun Tazieff (1914–1998), vulcanologist
 Renée Vivien (1877–1909), writer, poet
 Pearl White (1889–1938), American silent film star, famous for doing her own stunts in her serials The Perils of Pauline
 Jean-Pierre Wimille (1908–1949), Grand Prix race driver

Location
The entrance of the cemetery is located at 2, Rue du Commandant Schlœsing. The street in which it is situated is named for a Free French pilot, Squadron Leader Jacques-Henri Schlœsing (1919–1944), who flew with the wartime RAF until killed in action, the day that Paris was liberated.

The cemetery is behind the Trocadéro.

References

External links

  Passy Cemetery on the Mairie de Paris website (with plan)
  Passy Cemetery on the Cimetiéres de France et d'Ailleurs website
 Information and help in touring Passy cemetery.
 Photographs of Passy cemetery Documenting funerary statuary in Paris cemeteries; on pariscemeteries.com

Cemeteries in Paris
Buildings and structures in the 16th arrondissement of Paris

1820 establishments in France